Linisa tamaulipasensis is a species of air-breathing land snail, a terrestrial pulmonate gastropod mollusk in the family Polygyridae.

Gastropods described in 1857
Polygyridae